Hanns-Martin-Schleyer-Halle (sometimes shortened to Schleyer-Halle) is an indoor arena located in Stuttgart, Germany. The capacity of the arena is nearly 15,000 people. The venue was built in 1983 and is named for Hanns Martin Schleyer, a German former Schutzstaffel officer and employer representative, who was kidnapped and killed by the terrorist group Red Army Faction. It has a  track made of wood.

Sporting events

The arena hosted the final phase of the 1985 European basketball championship.

In tennis, the arena hosts some of the matches of Porsche Tennis Grand Prix, on a clay court designated as "Court 1". It also hosted the Stuttgart Masters when it was an ATP Super 9 event between 1996 and 2001.

The arena is also used as a velodrome and was used as the host for the 2003 UCI Track Cycling World Championships.

The 1989 World Artistic Gymnastics Championships, the 2007 World Artistic Gymnastics Championships, and the 2019 World Artistic Gymnastics Championships were held at the Hanns-Martin-Schleyer-Hall.

Concerts
Depeche Mode performed at the stadium seven times: the first occasion being 2 November 1987, during their Music for the Masses Tour. The second was on 15 October 1990, during their World Violation Tour. The third was on 25 June 1993, during their Devotional Tour. The fourth was on 23 September 1998, during their Singles Tour. The fifth was on 3 October 2001, during their Exciter Tour. The sixth was on 9 March 2006, during their Touring the Angel. The seventh was on 8 November 2009, during their Tour of the Universe. On 11 April 2002, Irish vocal pop band Westlife held a concert for their World of Our Own Tour supporting their album World of Our Own. In July 2009 Elton John gave a sold-out concert in the Schleyerhalle.

Slayer played their final European Show at the Schleyerhalle on 3 August 2019 on their farewell world tour.  
On 2 June 2020 Eric Clapton will perform at the arena during his Summer European Tour 2020.

See also
List of indoor arenas in Germany

References

External links

 
 information at FixedGearFever.com

Indoor arenas in Germany
Sport in Stuttgart
Handball venues in Germany
Velodromes in Germany
Cycle racing in Germany
Indoor track and field venues
Sports venues in Baden-Württemberg
Buildings and structures in Stuttgart
Sports venues completed in 1983
Basketball venues in Germany
1983 establishments in West Germany
1989 Davis Cup